Henry Pryce Jackman (born 1 June 1974) is an English composer. He composed music for films such as Kong: Skull Island, X-Men: First Class, Winnie the Pooh, Wreck-It Ralph, Ralph Breaks the Internet, Puss in Boots, Monsters vs. Aliens, Captain Phillips, Kick-Ass, Kick-Ass 2, Turbo, Big Hero 6, Ron's Gone Wrong, The Interview, Detective Pikachu and Strange World as well as the video games Uncharted 4: A Thief's End and Disney Infinity 2.0.

Life and career
Jackman was born in Hillingdon, London. He studied classical music at St. Paul's Cathedral Choir School, Eton College, Framlingham College and University of Oxford.

Jackman has done programming and production work with artists including Mike Oldfield (Voyager), Sally Oldfield (Flaming Star), Trevor Horn/Art of Noise (The Seduction of Claude Debussy), Elton John and Gary Barlow. He co-produced Seal's unreleased 2001 album Togetherland. "This Could Be Heaven", released from the album, was also co-written by Jackman and used on the movie The Family Man and included on the deluxe edition of Seal's compilation album Hits.

Jackman has released three albums, Utopia (2003), Transfiguration (2005), and Acoustica (2007; with Augustus Isadore).

Jackman had various minor roles on film scores since 2006, generally working with mentor Hans Zimmer, including for The Da Vinci Code (music programmer), The Dark Knight (music arranger) and additional music for Pirates of the Caribbean: Dead Man's Chest, At World's End, The Simpsons Movie, Kung Fu Panda and Hancock. In 2009, Jackman, Zimmer and John Powell won the 2008 Annie Award for Music in an Animated Television Production or Short Form for their work on DreamWorks Animation's Secrets of the Furious Five (a sequel to Kung Fu Panda). He has since composed soundtracks for Monsters vs. Aliens, Henri IV, Gulliver's Travels, X-Men: First Class, Winnie the Pooh, Abraham Lincoln: Vampire Hunter, Wreck-It Ralph, Captain America: The Winter Soldier, and Captain America: Civil War. His first major video game score was Uncharted 4: A Thief's End.

In March 2022, Reservoir Media acquired the rights to Jackman's catalog.

Family
Henry Jackman is the son of keyboardist and arranger Andrew Pryce Jackman, who was a member of The Syn and worked for many years with Chris Squire of Yes. His uncle Gregg Jackman is a sound engineer and producer who has worked with the King's Singers and Barclay James Harvest; Henry and his uncle both worked on Moa's 1999 album Universal. His grandfather, Bill Jackman, played clarinet on "When I'm Sixty-Four" on The Beatles' Sgt. Pepper's Lonely Hearts Club Band.

Discography

Singles
Mike Oldfield, "Women of Ireland" (1997): co-produced, programming
Elton John & LeAnn Rimes, "Written in the Stars" (1999): programming
Jocelyn Brown, "I Believe" (1999): programming, mixing
Seal, "This Could Be Heaven" (2000): co-written, co-produced, programming

Albums
Mike Oldfield, Voyager (1996): co-produced, programming
Sally Oldfield, Flaming Star
Conner Reeves, Earthbound (1998): programming
Michael Gordon, Weather (1998): production, sound design
Art of Noise, The Seduction of Claude Debussy (1999): "Born on a Sunday" co-produced, co-written
Moa, Universal (1999): writing, producing, mixing
Maryanna Matiss, Time to Fly (2001): writing, producing, mixing
Seal, Togetherland (2001/unreleased): producing, programming
Hans Zimmer, The Holiday OST (2006): co-writing
Vantage Point OST (2008): co-writing
various artists, Monsters vs. Aliens OST (2009): writing

Solo albums
Utopia (WestOneMusic, 2003)
Transfiguration (KPM Music, 2005)
Acoustica (KPM Music, 2007)

Filmography

Main composer

Other

Television scores

Video game scores

Awards and nominations

See also
Music of the Marvel Cinematic Universe

References

External links
Henry Jackman on Myspace

Interview Henry Jackman at FilmMusicSite

1974 births
Alumni of the University of Oxford
Animated film score composers
Annie Award winners
DreamWorks Animation people
English film score composers
English male film score composers
English keyboardists
English television composers
Living people
Male television composers
People from Hillingdon
Video game composers
Walt Disney Animation Studios people